The Blue Ferns (French: Les fougères bleues) is a 1977 French drama film directed by Françoise Sagan and starring Françoise Fabian, Gilles Ségal and Jean-Marc Bory. It was one of the final films released by Les Films Corona. Sagan adapted the screenplay from her own short story.

During a hunting trip in the countryside two couples, one married the other a ladies man and his girlfriend, interact.

Cast
 Françoise Fabian as Monika Berthier
 Jean-Marc Bory as Stanislas
 Gilles Ségal as Jérôme Berthier
 Caroline Cellier as Betty
 Francis Perrin as Antoine

References

Bibliography 
Oscherwitz,  Dayna & Higgins, MaryEllen . The A to Z of French Cinema. Scarecrow Press, 2009.
 Pallister, Janis L. French-speaking Women Film Directors: A Guide. Fairleigh Dickinson Univ Press, 1997.

External links 
 

1977 films
1977 drama films
French drama films
1970s French-language films
1970s French films

fr:Les Fougères bleues